Rathmullan is a civil parish in County Down, Northern Ireland. It is situated mainly in the historic baronies of Lecale Upper, with one townland in Lecale Lower.

Settlements
The civil parish contains the following settlements:
Killough

Townlands
Rathmullan civil parish contains the following townlands:

Ballylucas
Ballynewport
Ballyorgan
Ballyplunt
Ballyvaston
Glebe
Islandbane
Killough
Rathmullan Lower
Rathmullan Upper
Saint Johns Point

See also
List of civil parishes of County Down

References